Nischal Basnet is a Nepalese film director and actor who primarily appears in Nepali language films. He made his directorial debut in 2012 with the crime-thriller Loot and wrote screenplay for the film. The film focuses on Hakku Kale (played by Saugat Malla), who masterminds a bank robbery. The film received mixed reviews from the critics, some of whom criticized the script for not being original. According to The Kathmandu Post, the film "changed the discourse of the Nepali film industry". Loot earned 25.5 million Nepalese rupees (approximately US$218,000 in 2019), making it Nepal's highest-grossing film of 2012. Basnet went on to win the Dcine Award for Best Debut Director. In 2014, Basnet acted in and produced Ram Babu Gurung's romantic drama Kabaddi. In the film, Basnet plays Bibek, who tries to abduct a gangster's daughter. The same year, Basnet directed the dark comedy Talakjung vs Tulke. The film is set during the Nepalese Civil War, which lasted from 1996 to 2006. Basnet won the Film Critics Society of Nepal Award for Best Director and the National Film Award for Best Director. Talakjung vs Tulke was selected as the Nepalese entry for the Best Foreign Language Film at the 88th Academy Awards, but it was not nominated.

In 2017, Basnet directed Loot 2, the sequel to Loot. Loot 2 grossed 60.1 million Nepalese rupees (approximately US$524,000 in 2019) at the box office, surpassing the lifetime box office gross of Loot. After directing Loot 2, Basnet starred in Dui Rupaiyan (2017), portraying Jureli, one of two characters on a quest to find two rupees. In 2018, Basnet appeared in Dinesh Raut's Prasad, playing the role of Ramesh alongside actors Bipin Karki and Namrata Shrestha. For his role in the film, Basnet was nominated for a Dcine Award and the Kamana Film Award for Best Actor in a Negative Role.  Besides acting and directing, Basnet has served as a judge on Sarwanam Theater (2018), Nepal Idol (2019) and Nepal's Mega Cinestar (2019). He has also sung "Udhreko Choli", "Hit Geet", and "Ghyampe".

Films

Television

Music videos

Notes

References

External links 
 

Male actor filmographies
Nepalese filmographies
Director filmographies